Abolishing The Borders From Below was an anarchist magazine published by a Berlin-based collective since 2001. It was formed by a handful of Central and Eastern European and ex-Soviet migrant anarchists and political and counter-cultural anti-authoritarians.

The bi-monthly magazine was filled with articles from correspondents around Central and Eastern Europe and consisted of information about different political and cultural processes and activities in the region seen, commented on and analysed from an anarchist perspective.

It was printed regularly and distributed around the globe by Central and Eastern Europe contributors and by Active Distribution, from South Africa to the Philippines. The magazine folded in 2010.

References

External links
 Official website - not updated since 2014
 Full text of Issue #32 - May, 2008
 archive of all issues digitalized (pdf/jpg) - May 2021

2001 establishments in Germany
2010 disestablishments in Germany
Anarchist periodicals published in Germany
Anarchist websites
Cultural magazines published in Germany
Defunct political magazines published in Germany
English-language magazines
Bi-monthly magazines published in Germany
German political websites
Magazines established in 2001
Magazines disestablished in 2010
Magazines published in Berlin
Russian diaspora in Germany